Tashiro (田代) can refer to:

Slang
In Japan, "Tashiro" is a slang word. Tashiro refers to acts of peeping and taking sneak shots. Origin of the term derives from Masashi Tashiro, a famous celebrity who was prosecuted for filming up a woman's skirt in addition to later being arrested for peeping through the bathroom window of a man's house.

Place
Tashiro, Akita
Tashiro, Kagoshima

People with the surname
Junya Tashiro, Japanese fashion designer
, Japanese volleyball player
Kanichirō Tashiro, Japanese general
Masakazu Tashiro, Japanese footballer
Masashi Tashiro, Japanese television performer
, Japanese sport wrestler
Tsuramoto Tashiro, samurai
Yasutaka Tashiro, Japanese cyclist
Yoko Akino (real name is Yoko Tashiro), Japanese actress
Yūzō Tashiro, Japanese footballer

Other
Tashiro's indicator, mixed pH indicator

See also
Voyeurism

Japanese-language surnames